Peninsula Hardy (sometimes called "Pen Hardy") is a peninsula at one of the most southerly extremes of South America. It is the southern landform which extends into the Drake Passage to make the Bahia Nassau. It is part of a large island called Hoste, next to Isla Navarino and Isla Grande de Tierra del Fuego. It is located in the Commune of Cabo de Hornos, belonging to the Antártica Chilena Province of the Magallanes y Antártica Chilena Region, Chile. False Cape Horn is located at the southern tip of this peninsula.

Peninsulas of Chile
Landforms of Magallanes Region
Landforms of Tierra del Fuego